is a distance learning university which has students from all over Japan; it accepted its first students in 1985.

History

It was founded on the basic system of The Open University in the United Kingdom. The administration is based in Chiba City although it has offices and learning centers in each of Japan's 47 prefectures. The university offers accredited undergraduate and graduate degrees.

With nearly 90,000 students enrolled (in 2007), 45,000 students graduated from the university. It is one of the largest academic institutions in the nation, and qualifies as one of the world's mega universities. Since it was founded, over 780,000 students have taken courses from the institution.

Faculty of Liberal Arts

Bachelor's degree courses are available in six areas of study: Living and Welfare, Psychology and Education, Society and Industry, Humanities and Culture, Informatics, Nature and Environment.

2017 Syllabus

The syllabus is made up of foundation subjects, course subjects (introduction, speciality, and integrated), and graduation research units.  Each study unit is supported by a specially written textbook, in conjunction with fifteen 45 minute recorded lectures.  Many face-to-face lectures, condensed summer courses, and online units are also available.  Apart from a very select few, subjects are offered in Japanese only.

Humanities and Culture

Informatics

OUJ as a broadcasting station 

The OUJ Academia broadcasts lectures and administrative announcement programs. It owns television and radio broadcasting stations at the headquarters in Chiba City. All programs are recorded and edited at the headquarters and broadcasts on its Broadcasting Satellite (BS) channels to reach the whole nation. The broadcasts are exclusively in Japanese language as the medium of instruction. Article 50-4-1 of the Broadcasting Act prohibits the OUJ from broadcasting commercial messages. The cost of the broadcasting system is subsidised by the national budget. Until September 2018, it was transmitted from the Tokyo Tower via UHF television and FM radio, and relayed at Maebashi, Gunma to reach Kantō region.

It is not affiliated with any other broadcasting networks (although there were supports from television stations in Tokyo at the beginning). During the period as a terrestrial television station it was the only purely independent/isolated terrestrial station in Japan.

Broadcast media

Reception is free to the general public.

Nationwide on BS channel 231 (BS Campus ex) and 232 (BS Campus on) for television and channel 531 for radio. No contract charge or subscription fees are charged at OUJ-only recipients. Some cable television and cable radio also re-transmit the broadcasts.

See also
 School of the Air
 Satellite television

References

External links
 The Open University of Japan

Private universities and colleges in Japan
Open universities
Television stations in Japan
Radio in Japan
Universities and colleges in Chiba Prefecture
Independent television stations in Japan
1983 establishments in Japan
Educational institutions established in 1983
Educational and instructional television channels
Television channels and stations established in 1985
Radio stations established in 1985